The SC 250 (Sprengbombe Cylindrisch 250) was an air-dropped general purpose high-explosive bomb built by Germany during World War II and used extensively during that period. It could be carried by almost all German bomber aircraft, and was used to notable effect by the Junkers Ju 87 Stuka (Sturzkampfflugzeug or dive-bomber).  The bomb's weight was about 250 kg, from which its designation was derived.

It was used in the Eastern Front and many other theatres, and was feared for its destructive power. The SC 250 was one of the most commonly used bombs in World War II and was deployed extensively during the Blitz on London.

Design
The bomb consisted of two or three sections, depending on the grade of the bomb; in the grade (Güteklasse) I bombs, the nose cone and the bomb body were forged out of a single piece of high quality alloyed steel or the nose was welded to the body; these bombs were of the highest mechanical strength and they were meant to be used against robust targets necessitating penetration before detonation of the bomb, or as "Stabos" ("spike bombs").  The grade II and grade III bombs were made of separate nose cone, main body and aft cone parts welded together; the mechanical strength of the grade II bombs was approximately 80% of the grade I, in the grade III bombs, the mechanical strength on impact was ca. 40% of that of grade I bombs; these bombs were therefore meant to be used only on targets where instantaneous detonation on impact was necessary.  

After forging the body or welding the nose cone and the aft cone to the body, this was loaded with the exploder tube, the fuze pocket and then the main filling. Thereafter the body was sealed with the base plate, and the four-finned tail was attached. There were many fillings, all weighing ca.  (125–130 kg):

 Cast Trotyl (German code "14" or "Fp. 02"),
 Cast Füllpulver 60/40 (Fp. 60/40, amatol containing 60% Trotyl, codename "13").
 Cast Füllpulver 50/50 (Fp. 50/50, amatol with 50% Trotyl, codename "13A").
 Cast Amatol 39 (50% 1,3-dinitrobenzene, 35% ammonium nitrate, 15% hexogen, codename "52"), 
 Cast Amatol 40 (50% 2,4-dinitroanisole, 35% ammonium nitrate, 15% hexogen, codename "17").
 Cast Amatol 41 (52% ammonium nitrate, 6% calcium nitrate, 30% ethylenediamine dinitrate, 10% hexogen, 2% montan wax, codename "88"). 
 Pressed Ammonal D (90% ammonium nitrate, 5% naphthalene, 2.5% wood meal and 2.5% aluminium powder, codename "110").
 Pressed Ammonal DJ (70% ammonium nitrate, 20% trotyl, 10% aluminium powder, codename "113").
 Pressed Ammonal DJ1 (76% ammonium nitrate, 20% trotyl, 4% coarse aluminium powder, codename "114").
 Cast Trialen 105 (70% Trotyl, 15% hexogen, 15% aluminium powder, codename "105").

Bombs filled with Trialen 105 were to be used especially as water bombs/depth charges against enemy shipping and submarines, however the Trialen bombs could be used to a great effect against land targets as well. The bomb was held in place by suspension lugs, which could be fitted either to the nose to hold the bomb vertically inside a bomb bay, or to the body if it were slung horizontally below the fuselage or wing of an aircraft.

Variants
Type 1 (Güteklasse I)
 Model JA: One piece construction of forged steel.
 Model L: One piece construction of tube steel.
 Model L2: Two piece construction, nose of forged steel, body of tube steel. Sometimes fitted with a  spike to ensure detonation above ground, called a "Stabo", (Stachelbombe, "Spike Bomb").

 Type 2 (Güteklasse II)
 Model JB: Two-piece construction of forged steel.

Type 333 (Güteklasse III)
 Model JC: Three piece construction, nose and aft cone of forged steel, body made of tube steel.
 Model B: Three piece construction; nose of cast steel, body of tube steel, and base of arched steel case.
 Model K: Three-piece construction; nose of cast hardened steel, body of tube steel, and base of cast steel.

Fuzes
The SC 250 could be fitted with a variety of fuzes depending on the target:
 Type 25B electric impact fuze. This could be set to instantaneous detonation, short delay (less than 1 second), or for a 17-second delay.
 Type 17 electric clockwork fuze. This was a time-delay fuze; the Type 17 and 17A could be set for any time between 2 and 72 hours after dropping, while the 17B could be set to detonate between 3 and 135 minutes. To prevent the bomb being defused by Allied bomb disposal personnel they were fitted with:
 Type ZUS 40 mechanical antiwithdrawal fuze.
 Type 50 and 50B (called "Type Y" by the British from a distinguishing marking stamped on the face of the fuse) electric anti-disturbance fuze. This used three mercury switches to detonate the bomb if the fuze was disturbed or rotated. John Pilkington Hudson was awarded the George Medal in 1943 for being the first to successfully disable a Y fuze.
 Type 38 electric impact fuze. The Type 38 was designed for use at low-level against shipping, while the Type 38sl. was for use as an anti-submarine bomb.
 Type 59B electric aerial burst fuze. Could be set to detonate 12, 41 or 58 seconds after release.
 Type 79 electric aerial burst fuze. Could be set to detonate either 3, 10, 25 or 30 seconds after release.

Post-war discoveries
After the war there was a steady stream of unexploded SC250s found and disarmed or detonated in the latter 55 years of the 20th century. However, even in 2000s, more are regularly discovered:

On 23 March 2015, an SC250 was unearthed in a building site in Bermondsey, South London. It was safely detonated in a quarry in Kent two days later.
A SC250 bomb was found in Portsmouth Harbour during dredging work to widen the port's channel in February 2017. It was removed by a Royal Navy Explosive Ordnance Disposal team and detonated out at sea.
In April 2017 a bomb was found in Minsk during the demolition of BelExpo complex.
An SC250 bomb was found at a building site in Aston, Birmingham on 15 May 2017, it was detonated on site a day later.
In May 2017 a bomb was unearthed at a building site in Ternopil, Ukraine.
In January 2019 an SC250 bomb was found on a construction site in Skopje, Macedonia. Later it was detonated in the military base Krivolak.
 On 23 May 2019 an SC250 was discovered during construction works near Kingston University Campus, London, UK.
 On 15 December 2020 an SC250 detonated under a British fishing boat off the Norfolk coast, severely injuring several crew.
 On 12 May 2022 an SC250 was found in Ta’ Qali, Malta while excavation works where being carried out behind the aviation museum
 On 7 February 2023 an SC250 was found in the river Yare at Great Yarmouth during dredging works at the site of the new third river crossing.

Photo Gallery

Citations
References

Bibliography
 

World War II aerial bombs of Germany